This is a timeline documenting the events of heavy metal in the year 1972.

Newly formed bands 
Baumstam
Beck, Bogert & Appice
Bleak House 
 Cirith Ungol
 Geordie (featuring Brian Johnson on vocals)
 The Handsome Beasts
 Heavy Metal Kids (featuring Gary Holton on vocals)
 Jerusalem
 Magnum
Mother's Finest
Petra
Poobah
Pop Mašina
Progresiv TM
Resurrection Band
Tempest 
The Sensational Alex Harvey Band
Styx
 The Tubes
 Twisted Sister
 Urchin
 Van Halen
West, Bruce and Laing

Albums

January

March

April

May

June

September

November

December

Unknown 
 Budgie – Squawk
 Elf – Elf
Night Sun – Mournin'
Scorpions – Lonesome Crow

Disbandments 
 The Jeff Beck Group 
 MC5 (reformed in 2003)
 Mountain (reformed in 1973)
 Steppenwolf (reformed in 1974)

Events

References 

1970s in heavy metal music
Metal